The Laguna 24S is an American trailerable sailboat that was designed by W. Shad Turner as a cruiser and first built in 1980.

The same basic design was used for the Balboa 24 in 1981.

Production
The design was built by Laguna Yachts in the United States, from 1980 to 1987 with 350 boats completed, but it is now out of production.

Design
The Laguna 24S is a recreational keelboat, built predominantly of fiberglass, with wood trim. It has a fractional sloop rig, a raked stem, a plumb transom, a transom-hung rudder controlled by a tiller and a fixed fin keel. It displaces  and carries  of ballast.

The Laguna 24ST model has a mast that is about  taller.

Variants
Laguna 24S
This model was introduced in 1980. It displaces  and carries  of ballast.
Laguna 24ST
This tall mast model has a mast about  taller,  more ballast and was introduced in 1984. It displaces  and carries  of ballast.

See also
List of sailing boat types

References

Keelboats
1980s sailboat type designs
Sailing yachts 
Trailer sailers
Sailboat type designs by W. Shad Turner
Sailboat types built by Laguna Yachts